Akbar Kakkattil (7 July 1954 – 17 February 2016) was an Indian short-story writer and novelist from Kerala state.

Life
Akbar was born on 7 July 1954 at Kakkattil in Vadakara as the only son out of the two children of his parents, Sri. P. Abdulla and Smt. Kunjhamina. He completed his school education from Parayil L P School, Kakkattil, and Sanskrit Secondary School Vattoli. He spent the first half of the first year pre-degree at Farook College, Calicut and studied up to degree course in English Language and Literature at Government College, Madappally. The first year of P G course in Malayalam Language & Literature he studied at Sree Kerala Varma College, Thrissur and again moved to Government Brennen College, Thalassery to complete the course. He took his Bachelor of Education degree from Government Brennen College Of Teacher Education, Thalassery. While studying he was elected chairman of College Union both at Government College, Madappally Vadakara & Government Brennen College Of Teacher Education, Thalassery. He was also executive member of University Union of Calicut University. He has served as a Malayalam teacher for about 30 years in various schools, including National Higher Secondary School, Vattoli, where he worked for a long period.

Akbar Kakkattil has worked as a member of the governing body of South Zone Cultural Centre of Central Government of India and Kerala State Institute of Children's literature. He has also served as member of the curriculum steering committee, Kerala Lalitha Kala Akademi, State Television Jury, State Cinema jury, Ezhuthachan Puraskara Samiti and Programme Advisory Board of Akashavani, Kozhikkode. Besides he has worked as an honorary editor of Malayalam Publications and Olive Publications, Kozhikode. He had been a permanent jury member of the first educational reality show in Kerala, Haritha Vidyalaya.  He was also a member of Malayalam Advisory Board of Kendra Sahitya Akademi and Convener of Publication Committee, Kerala Sahitya Akademi. He was the vice president of the Kerala Sahitya Academi and a member of Malayalam Advisory Panel of National Book Trust, Govt. of India and Malayalam Advisory Board, Govt of Kerala. He was also a member of State Literacy Mission's Magazine Aksharakairali Editorial Board and Curriculum Committee of National Institute of Open Schooling (NIOS), Govt. of India. Akbar Kakkattil has also served as a part of the committee for the revision of Malayalam text books from the primary to the higher secondary level. Right from his college days he has been associated with the Film Society movements. He died on 17 February 2016.

Literary life
Akbar Kakkattil turned to creative writing at the age of fourteen by publishing short stories in a regular column for children in the leading Malayalam weekly Mathrubhumi. He got published his first story Pothichoru in 1969 through the weekly. He maintained his connection with G. Sankara Kurup, Thakazhi and Basheer. He has a collection of works to his credit that comprises 54 books. They include four novels, seven collections of novelettes, twenty-seven anthologies of short stories, six collections of essays, memoirs, a play and a volume of critical essays and interviews with the leading writers of Malayalam. He has received the Kerala Sahitya Akademi Award twice. The first ever award in humour section in 1992 for his School Diary- an anthology of short essays and in the year 2004, 'Vadakkuninnoru Kudumba Vrithantham' was awarded as the best novel. He has also been honoured twice by the State Government – in the year 1998, his work 'Sthrynam' was awarded the Joseph Mundassery Award for the best Novel. The Television Award for the best story writer (School Diary – Doordarsan serial) for the year 2002 also went to him.

The fellowship of Literature from the Government of India was bestowed on him in the year 1992. The Abu Dhabi Sakthi Award was received by him in the year 2002. Besides, he has been awarded the S K Pottakkad award, Ankanam Award, Malayala Manorama Prize, Rajiv Gandhi Peace Foundation Award, C H Muhammed Koya Award, T V Kochubaava Award, V Sambasivan Puraskar and Dubai Book Trust Award etc.

His selected stories includes 'Addiction, Achanum Makalum, Samasya, Avasanam, Oru Thenginte Darsanam, Verum Avarthanam, Sourayoodham, Aanakkariyam and Anthya Dinam' are translated to English by P A Noushad and Arun Lal Mokeri. Both translators are natives and intimates of Akbar. “Akbar Mash himself had expressed his satisfaction over the translation," said Noushad.

His book on Adoor Gopalakrishnan titled Varoo Adoorileykku Pokam is translated to Tamil ("Adoor Gopalakrishnan – Idam Porul Kalai) and his novel Mrithyuyogam is translated to Kannada (Mrithyuyoga).

Works
Short-story
1978 – Ee Vazhi Vannavar
1982 – Medhaswam
1986– Shameelafahmi
1989 – Adhyapaka Kathakal
1991– Kadarkutty Utharav
1992 – Aaram Kalam
1994 – Veedinu Thee Pidikkunnu
1995 –  Aakaasathinte Athirukal
1996 – Naadaapuram
1999 – Veentum Narangnga Muricchappol
1999 – Therenjetuttha Kathakal
2000 – Oru Vayanakariyute Aavalathikal
2001 – Cheriya Kathakal
2003 – Mayakkannan
2005 – Sesham Screenil
2006 – Shreepriyayute Aadhikal
2007 – Jeansitta Penkuttiye Ottaykku Kittiyal Enthu Cheyyanam?
2008 – Kathakal – Therenjetuttha Kathakal
2009 – Njangal Liba Johnine Pedikkunnu
2009 – Puthiya Vaathilukal
2009 – Durbar
2010 – Aalperumattam
2011 – Mailanchikkaatt
2011 – Sthreelingam (Selected Works)
2012 – 2011-le 'Aan' kutti
2014 - Kannichuvatukal ( Ee Vazhi Vannavarum Medhaswavum)
2014 - Ippol Undakunnath

Novelette
1982 – Randum Rand
1993 – Moonnum Moonn
1994 – Oru Vivahithante Chila Swakarya Nimishangal
2001 – Dharma Sankadangngalude Rajavu
2005 – Pathinonnu Novelettukal
2010 – Jiyad Gold Poovitumpol
2010 – Keerthana

Novels
1989 – Mruthyu Yogam
1995 – Strainam
1997 – Harithaabhakalkkapuram
2001 – Vadakkuninnoru Kudumba Vrithaantham
2012 – Akbar Kakkattilinte Naalu Novelukal

Essays
1979 – Prarthanayum Perunnalum
1989 – School Diary
2010 – Anubhavam Orma Yathra
2010 – Punathilum Njanum Pinne Kavya Madhavanum
2014 - A Penkutti Ippol Evide?
2014 - Nakshathrangalute Chiri

Criticism, Life-sketch, Interview
1993 – Sargasameeksha
2014 - Namude M T

Memoirs
1993 – Adhyayana Yathra

Play
1996 – Kunjhi Moosa Vivaahithanaavunnu

Cinema
2006 – Varoo Adoorileykk Pokaam
2009 – Inganeyum Oru Cinemakkaalam

Children's literature
2008 – Nokkoo, Ayal Ningngalil Thanneyund

Service Story
2010 – Padham Muppath

Travelogue
2011 – Kakkattil Yathrayilanu

Awards and honours
 Merit Scholarship for Sanskrit by state government (1967–'70)
 Malayala Manorama Prize for Essay Writing (1971)
 Calicut University Union Prize for Novel (1974)
 Ankanam literary Award for 'Shameelafahmi' (1987)
 S K Pottekkatt Award for "Mrithyuyogam' (1991)
 Indian Government Fellowship for Literature (1992)
 Kerala Sahithya Academy Awards for 'School Diary (1992) and 'Vadakku Ninnoru Kutumbavrithantham' (2003)
 CH Muhammed Koya memorial Award for 'Sarga Sameeksha' (1995)
 Joseph Mundasseri Award for 'Sthrainam' (1998)
 State Television Award for best story (School Diary 2000)
 Abu Dhabi Sakthi Award (Novel) for 'Vadakku Ninnoru Kutumbavrithantham' (2002)
 Rajeev Gandhi Peace Foundation Award for 'Selected Stories' (2003)
 Gramadeepam Award (2005)
 T V Kochubava Award (2006)
 V Sambasivan Award (2008)
 Gulf Malayali Dot Com Award (2010)
 Wise men international Excellence Award (2010)
 Dubai Pravasi Book Trust Award (2012)
 First Academic Council Award of Kerala Aided Higher Secondary Association (2013).

References

External links
The Hindu Sunday, Feb 08, 2004-Akbar Kakkattil wins best novelist award
 Akbar Kakkattil – Who's Who of Indian Writers, 1999: A-M By Kartik Chandra Dutt, Sahitya Akademi
 Sargasameeksha (Study, life sketch, interview) by Akbar Kakkatil, Second Edition, 2012 January, D C Books, Kottayam. page 502,503,504.
 Jeevacharithra Parambara – Akbar Kakkattil – Ed. by Vijayan, Runnummakkara, Published by Faith Books Vatakara, Kozhikode, 2013
saahithya akkadami : 'അക്ബർ കക്കട്ടിൽ പുതിയ വൈസ് പ്രസിഡന്റ്’ Mathrubhumi Daily – Saturday, 29 December 2012
 D C Books, Mathrubhumi Books, Lipi Publications, Ascend Publications, Harithakam Books, Bulletins of Publications - 2015

2016 deaths
Malayalam novelists
1954 births
People from Kozhikode district
Recipients of the Kerala Sahitya Akademi Award
Recipients of the Abu Dhabi Sakthi Award
Malayalam-language writers
20th-century Indian novelists
Novelists from Kerala
Indian male novelists
Indian male short story writers
20th-century Indian short story writers
20th-century Indian male writers